María Patiño Castro (born 16 August 1971) is a Spanish journalist, pundit, and television presenter known for social features and celebrity gossip.

Biography

Childhood and beginnings
The daughter of Antonio Patiño Gacio (1946–2017) and Paz Castro Fustes (1947–2014), María Patiño has two younger siblings, Antonio and Carlos. She was raised in Seville with her parents and siblings, although the family continues to be linked to her native Galicia. Her father, a reserve lieutenant colonel, was vice president of Lar Gallego de Sevilla and the deputy director of the institution's choir.

With a degree in Journalism from the private school CEADE, she started her career at the Seville branch of the news agency Europa Press.

Antena 3
Patiño's first contacts with television, a medium through which she has reached a certain popularity in Spain, began on the Canal Sur program Ven con nosotros (2001), which was followed by the Antena 3 magazine Sabor a verano (2002), presented by Inés Ballester.

After her stint on Jordi González's late-night show Abierto al anochecer (2002), she appeared on what was one of the most followed programs of its type,  (2002–2004), together with Ana Rosa Quintana.

However, she gained her greatest popularity from the social chronicle talk show  (later renamed DEC), led by Jaime Cantizano on Antena 3 from 2003 to 2011.

In the 2007–2008 season she presented the magazine , which was canceled due to low ratings.

Since then, she has not returned to work for Antena 3, since there are no gossip programs (programas del corazón) on the network.

Telecinco
Beginning on 5 November 2011, she began working as a regular contributor to La noria.

In the summer of 2014, after the departure of Terelu Campos, María replaced Jorge Javier Vázquez during his vacation as a presenter of Sálvame Deluxe for eleven episodes – seven normal programs, three recorded specials, and one live special. During Vazquez's 2014 Christmas break, Patiño returned as presenter.

On 16 October 2014, her incorporation into  as an official contributor was announced. During this time, Patiño suffered the loss of her mother and father.

She has become the official guest presenter of Sábado Deluxe, and every time Vazquez is absent, she directs the program. In addition, since 2017, she has also presented  on the same network.

Other networks
In 2015 María Patiño debuted as an actress with the short film La cara del diablo, appearing alongside her romantic partner Ricardo Rodríguez Olivares. Previously she had had minor roles in 2011's Torrente 4: Lethal Crisis, where she made a cameo as a tabloid reporter covering an event, and in 2004, when she played herself in the eighth episode of the third season of Aquí no hay quien viva, where a resident of the building attends the set of Dónde estás corazón. In that chapter, she worked with her colleagues Jaime Cantizano, Chelo García-Cortés, and Antonio Montero.

Filmography

TV programs

TV series

Films

References

External links
 
 

1971 births
Living people
People from Ferrol, Spain
Spanish television journalists
Spanish television presenters
Spanish women journalists
Women television personalities
Women television journalists
Spanish women television presenters